Zettl is a German-language surname. It may refer to:
Alex Zettl, American carbon scientist
Mark Zettl (born 1998), German footballer 
Walter Zettl (1929–2018), German dressage rider and Olympic-level dressage horse trainer

References 

German-language surnames
Surnames of Austrian origin
Surnames of Bavarian origin